Dominic William Jefferies (born 22 May 2002) is a Welsh professional footballer who plays as a midfielder for  club Gillingham. He is a product of the Cardiff City and Newport County academies and began his professional career with Brentford, before transferring to Gillingham in 2022.

Career

Newport County 
A midfielder, Jefferies came through the youth systems at Caerleon and Cardiff City, before joining the Newport County academy at the age of 14. He signed a scholarship at the age of 16 and made six first team appearances during the first half of the 2019–20 season, all in cup matches. On 21 January 2020, Jefferies joined Southern League Premier Division South club Salisbury on an initial one-month work experience loan. He made four appearances and scored one goal before being recalled to Rodney Parade after the initial one-month period, due to an injury crisis. Jefferies was an unused substitute during two further first team matches prior to the curtailment of the 2019–20 season in March 2020. He was not offered a professional contract and was released in June 2020.

Return to Salisbury 
On 31 July 2020, Jefferies signed a permanent contract with Southern League Premier Division South club Salisbury. Prior to the 2020–21 season being declared null and void in February 2021, he had made nine appearances and scored one goal. Jefferies turned down a new contract and departed Salisbury in June 2021. He made 13 appearances and scored two goals during his two spells at the Raymond McEnhill Stadium.

Brentford 
After spending much of the second half of the 2020–21 season on trial with the B team at Championship club Brentford, Jefferies transferred to the newly-promoted Premier League club on 24 June 2021. He signed a one-year contract, with the option of a further year, for a training compensation fee. Following the departure of B team captain Nathan Shepperd in January 2022, Jefferies took over the role and captained the team to victory in the 2022 London Senior Cup Final. Jefferies scored eight goals in 42 appearances during the 2021–22 season and his performances were recognised with the Brentford B Players' Player of the Year award. He transferred out of the club in June 2022.

Gillingham 
On 16 June 2022, Jefferies signed an undisclosed-length contract with League Two club Gillingham, effective 22 June 2022.

Personal life 

Career statistics

Honours 
Brentford B

 London Senior Cup: 2021–22
Individual

 Brentford B Players' Player of the Year: 2021–22

References

External links

Dom Jefferies at gillinghamfootballclub.com

Living people
Welsh footballers
Association football midfielders
Newport County A.F.C. players
Salisbury F.C. players
2002 births
Brentford F.C. players
Southern Football League players
Gillingham F.C. players
English Football League players